Lajeunesse or La Jeunesse or Jeunesse or variant may refer to:

People
 Claude Lajeunesse (born 1941), current President and Vice-Chancellor of Concordia University
 Emma Albani (1847-1930), born Marie-Louise-Emma-Cécile Lajeunesse, Canadian soprano
 Omer LaJeunesse (1908-1994), U.S. American football player
 Serge Lajeunesse (born 1950), retired ice hockey defenceman

Literature 
 Gabriel Lajeunesse, a character in the poem Evangeline, A Tale of Acadie
 La Jeunesse, or New Youth, an influential Chinese literary magazine of the 20th century

Other
 Jeunesse Esch, the Jeunesse soccer team in Esch
 La Jeunesse, a sculpture by Pierre Charles Lenoir
 Youth (1934 film) or Jeunesse, a French drama film directed by Georges Lacombe

See also
 Pavillon de la Jeunesse, indoor arena in Quebec City, Quebec, Canada
 Coupe de la Jeunesse, international rowing regatta
 Front de la Jeunesse (disambiguation)